Ștefan cel Mare (formerly Șerbești) is a commune in Neamț County, Western Moldavia, Romania. It is composed of seven villages: Bordea, Cârligi, Deleni, Dușești, Ghigoiești, Soci, and Ștefan cel Mare.

Natives
 Vasile Chelaru

References

Communes in Neamț County
Localities in Western Moldavia